Pelinnaioi is a former municipality in the Trikala regional unit, Thessaly, Greece. Since the 2011 local government reform it is part of the municipality Farkadona, of which it is a municipal unit. The municipal unit has an area of 63.270 km2. Population 2,738 (2011). The seat of the municipality was in Taxiarches. The name reflects the ancient city of Pelinnaeum, the ruins of which are located nearby.

References

Populated places in Trikala (regional unit)

el:Δήμος Πελλιναίων